28 Leonis Minoris (28 LMi) is a solitary, orange hued star located in the northern constellation Leo Minor, the lesser lion. It has an apparent magnitude of 5.5, allowing it to be faintly visible to the naked eye. At its current distance, the star brightness is diminished by 0.14 magnitudes due to interstellar dust.

This is a population II giant star with a stellar classification of K1 III. It has a comparable mass to the Sun but has expanded to 22.6 times its girth. It has an iron abundance 90% of the Sun's, making it slightly metal deficient.

References

K-type giants
Population II stars
Leo Minor
BD+34 02123
090040
050935
4081
Leonis Minoris, 28